Leslie James Ellis (24 November 1910 – 30 March 1971) was a New Zealand jockey and racehorse trainer. He was born in Nightcaps, Southland, New Zealand on 24 November 1910. He was posthumously inducted into the New Zealand Sports Hall of Fame in 1997.

See also

 Thoroughbred racing in New Zealand

References

1910 births
1971 deaths
New Zealand jockeys
People from Nightcaps, New Zealand
20th-century New Zealand people